Kingstone is a civil parish in the district of East Staffordshire, Staffordshire, England.  It contains 13 buildings that are recorded in the National Heritage List for England.  Of these, one is at Grade II*, the middle grade, and the others are at Grade II, the lowest grade.  The parish contains the villages of Kingstone and Gratwich, and is otherwise rural.  The listed buildings consist of houses, farmhouses, churches, a former mill, and mileposts.


Key

Buildings

References

Citations

Sources

Lists of listed buildings in Staffordshire